Thomas Craig Fields (November 9, 1825 in St. Lawrence County, New York – January 25, 1885 in Saint-André-d'Argenteuil, Quebec, Canada) was an American lawyer and politician from New York.

Life
He studied law in Delhi, was admitted to the bar in 1846, and practiced in New York City. In 1847, he married Annie E. Smith. He was a Central Park Commissioner from 1857 to 1870; and a New York City Park Commissioner from 1870 to 1872.

He was a member of the New York State Assembly (New York Co., 17th D.) in 1863; of the New York State Senate (7th D.) in 1864 and 1865; and again of the State Assembly (New York Co., 19th D.) in 1870, 1871 and 1872.

During the impeachment of New York State Supreme Court Justice George G. Barnard, among the charges it was noted that Barnard denied alimony to Annie on behalf of Fields.

He was a member of the Tweed Ring, and in the autumn of 1872 he fled to Cuba, then Europe, and finally Canada, and died while being a fugitive from justice at his residence "The Priory", near St. Andrews, in Quebec.

Sources
 The New York Civil List compiled by Franklin Benjamin Hough, Stephen C. Hutchins and Edgar Albert Werner (1870; pg. 443 and 498)
  Biographical Sketches of the State Officers and the Members of the Legislature of the State of New York in 1862 and '63 by William D. Murphy (pg. 317f)
 NYC Park Commissioners
 TOM FIELDS GONE in NYT on October 12, 1872
 THE FIREMEN'S CLAIMS; Verdict Against Thomas C. Fields at Suit of the People for $554,062.73 in NYT on May 21, 1873
 THOMAS C. FIELDS DEAD in NYT on January 26, 1885

References

1825 births
1885 deaths
Democratic Party New York (state) state senators
People from St. Lawrence County, New York
Democratic Party members of the New York State Assembly
Politicians from New York City
19th-century American politicians
Lawyers from New York City
19th-century American lawyers